House of Vermandois refers to two families that reigned as Counts of Vermandois:
 Herbertien dynasty, an illegitimate line of the Carolingian dynasty that ruled Vermandois from 896 to 1080. 
 Capetian House of Vermandois, an cadet line of the Capetian dynasty that ruled Vermandois from 1080 to 1167.